Avigdor ben Simḥah ha-Levi Glogauer (–1810), also known as Avigdor Levi and by the acronym Alem, was a German Jewish grammarian and poet.

Biography
Avigdor Glogauer was born to poor Jewish parents in the lower Silesian town of Glogau. His father Simḥah was a pious Talmud teacher, and his mother Bräunche was a member of the prominent Teomim rabbinical family. Glogauer was a private tutor for some time in Berlin, where he joined Moses Mendelssohn's circle of maskilim. He moved to Prague in 1768, and there became a teacher.

Early in 1773, while traveling through Saxony, he was arrested on a false charge of theft, and lingered in the prison of Pirna for ten months. During his confinement he pursued his studies in the Tanakh, the Talmud, and medieval Hebrew philosophy without interruption. A letter from Mendelssohn, dated January 13, 1774, convinced the authorities to clear him of all suspicion and set him at liberty. Through the aid of Isaac Dessau and his relative, Rabbi Hirschel Levin of Berlin, he was enabled to return to Prague.AVIGDOR BEN SIMḤAH HA-LEVI OF GLOGAU (or Glogauer ; pseudonym Alem ; c. 1725–1810), teacher and author. In his youth he was one of the maskilim of Moses Mendelssohn's circle in Berlin. He later (1768) moved to Prague where he wrote a short Hebrew grammar, Davar Tov, which he published together with the treatise Marpe Lashon by R. Moses b. Ḥaviv (Prague, 1783). Avigdor also published a collection of Mendelssohn's letters to him, Iggerot Remad (in two pamphlets, Vienna, 1792, 1797), in one of which Mendelssohn explains his purpose in translating the Pentateuch into German. The second volume also contains a selection of Avigdor's poems entitled Ḥotam Tokhnit.

Work

The first work Avigdor published was an elementary Hebrew grammar entitled Davar tov ('A Good Thing'; Prague, 1783), with a haskama by Rabbi Yechezkel Landau. The book included a table of conjugations, as well as an excerpt of Moses ibn Ḥabib's linguistic treatise Marpe lashon ('Healing of Speech'). In 1792 he edited the first series of letters which Mendelssohn had addressed to him, and in 1797 supplemented it with a second series. This supplement forms the appendix to his didactic poem, Ḥotem tokhnit ('The Perfect Seal'), which aims at proving that the teachings of the Bible surpass all the systems of philosophy ever invented, from Socrates to Immanuel Kant. In 1802 Avigdor edited the Pentateuch with the commentary of Mendelssohn and an introduction of his own. The last of his literary efforts was a poem included in Ze'ev Wolf Buchner's Tzaḥut ha-melitzah (Berlin, 1810).

Publications

References
 

1720s births
1810 deaths
18th-century German educators
18th-century German Jews
18th-century German male writers
18th-century German poets
Grammarians of Hebrew
Hebrew-language poets
Jewish educators
Jewish German writers
Jewish grammarians
People from Głogów
People of the Haskalah
Prisoners and detainees of Germany